Guglielmo Bruno (died 1531) was a Roman Catholic prelate who served as Bishop of Andros (1492–1531).

On 26 August 1492, Guglielmo Bruno was appointed during the papacy of Pope Alexander VI as Bishop of Andros. He served as Bishop of Andros until his death in 1531.

See also 
Catholic Church in Greece

References 

15th-century Roman Catholic bishops in the Republic of Venice
16th-century Roman Catholic bishops in the Republic of Venice
Bishops appointed by Pope Alexander VI
1531 deaths